Braulio Antonio Leal Salvo (born 22 November 1981) is a Chilean former footballer who played as a midfielder.

Club career

Youth career

Fuentes started his career at Primera División de Chile club Colo-Colo. He progressed from the under categories club all the way to the senior team.

Chile and Portugal

He began his professional career in 2000 with Colo-Colo where he stayed until 2006. In the club he achieved two tournaments, the Clausura 2002 and the Apertura 2006.

In 2004, he had a short stint with Portuguese club Vitória Sport Clube. In 2007, he signed for Audax Italiano, where he has become a fixture in the starting eleven. But in 2009 Unión Española signed this defensive midfielder, then became the captain of the team.

O'Higgins

Leal in 2013 signed for O'Higgins along with teammate Gonzalo Barriga.
On December 10, 2013, he won the Apertura 2013-14 with O'Higgins and was the captain of team. In the tournament, he played in 13 of 18 matches. In 2014, he won the Supercopa de Chile against Deportes Iquique.

He participated with the club in the 2014 Copa Libertadores where they faced Deportivo Cali, Cerro Porteño and Lanús, being third and being eliminated in the group stage.

Magallanes
On 5 June 2019, Leal joined Deportes Magallanes.

Retirement
In November 2021, he announced his retirement from the football activity after a 22-year career.

Coaching career
Following his retirement, Leal assumed as the Technical Head of the Magallanes youth system, at the same he performs as coach.

Honours

Club
Colo-Colo
Primera División de Chile (2): 2002 Clausura, 2006 Apertura

O'Higgins
Primera División (1): 2013 Apertura
Supercopa de Chile: 2014

Individual

O'Higgins
Medalla Santa Cruz de Triana: 2014

References

External links

1981 births
Living people
Footballers from Santiago
Chilean footballers
Chilean expatriate footballers
Chile international footballers
Colo-Colo footballers
Vitória S.C. players
Everton de Viña del Mar footballers
Audax Italiano footballers
Unión Española footballers
O'Higgins F.C. footballers
San Luis de Quillota footballers
Deportes Iquique footballers
Deportes Magallanes footballers
Magallanes footballers
Expatriate footballers in Portugal
Chilean expatriate sportspeople in Portugal
Chilean Primera División players
Primeira Liga players
Primera B de Chile players
Association football midfielders
Chilean football managers